58th ACE Eddie Awards
February 17, 2008

Feature Film (Dramatic): 
 The Bourne Ultimatum 

Feature Film (Comedy or Musical): 
 Sweeney Todd: The Demon Barber of Fleet Street 

The 58th ACE Eddie Awards were held on 17 February 2008 in the International Ballroom, Beverly Hilton Hotel, Los Angeles, California, USA; the nominees and winners are listed below.

Winners and nominees

Film
 Best Edited Film - Dramatic:
 Christopher Rouse – The Bourne Ultimatum
Jay Cassidy – Into the Wild
John Gilroy – Michael Clayton
Joel Coen and Ethan Coen (a.k.a. Roderick Jaynes) – No Country for Old Men
Dylan Tichenor – There Will Be Blood

 Best Edited Film - Musical or Comedy:
 Chris Lebenzon – Sweeney Todd: The Demon Barber of Fleet Street
Michael Tronick – Hairspray
Dana E. Glauberman – Juno
Stephen Rivkin and Craig Wood – Pirates of the Caribbean: At World's End
Darren Holmes – Ratatouille

 Best Edited Documentary Film:
 Geoffrey Richman, Chris Seward and Dan Swietlik – Sicko
Edgar Burcksen and Leonard Feinstein – Darfur Now
Leslie Iwerks and Stephen Myers – The Pixar Story

Television
 Best Edited Half-Hour Television Series:
 Steven Rasch – Curb Your Enthusiasm for "The Bat Mitzvah"
Ken Eluto – 30 Rock for "The C Word" -
Shannon Mitchell – Californication for "Hell-A Woman"

 Best Edited Reality Series:
Michael Glickman and Chuck Montgomery – Cops"' for "Country Love"Pam Malouf, Hans Van Riet and David Timoner – Dancing With The Stars for "404"
Mike Denny – Man Vs. Wild for "Everglades" Best Edited One-Hour TV Series - Commercial Television:Norman Buckley – Chuck for "Pilot"Malcolm Jamieson – Damages for "Pilot"
Karen Stern – Law & Order: Special Victims Unit for "Paternity" Best Edited Miniseries or Television Film - Commercial Television:Robert Ferretti and Scott Vickery – The Company: Night 2Mark J. Goldman, Christopher Nelson, Stephen Semel and Henk Van Eeghen – Lost: Through the Looking GlassPaul Dixon – Pictures of Hollis Woods Best Edited One-Hour Television Series - Non-Commercial Television:
Sidney Wolinsky – The Sopranos for "Made in America"
Stewart Schill – Dexter for "It's Alive"
David Siegel – Rome for "De Patre Vostro"

 Best Edited Miniseries or Television Film - Non-Commercial Television:
Tatiana S. Riegel and Leo Trombetta – Pu-239
Michael Brown and Michael Ornstein – Bury My Heart at Wounded KneeMary Jo Markey – Life Support''

References

External links
ACE Award 2008 at the Internet Movie Database

2008 film awards
2008 guild awards
58
2008 in American cinema